Universal City is a city in Bexar County, Texas, United States. It borders San Antonio to the northeast, and is adjacent to Randolph Air Force Base. The population was 19,720 at the 2020 census. It is part of the San Antonio Metropolitan Statistical Area.

History
Universal City was established in 1960. Through Universal City is Pat Booker Road, the commercial thoroughfare of the city.

Geography

The mean center of Universal City is located at  (29.552883698, –98.307576166).

Demographics

As of the 2020 United States census, there were 19,720 people, 7,233 households, and 5,159 families residing in the city.

As of the census of 2010,  18,530 people, 7,575 households, and 4,973 families resided in the city. The population density was 3,321.4 people per square mile (1,282.4/km). The 8,036 housing units averaged 1,120.5 per square mile (432.6/km). The racial makeup of the city was 75.4% White, 10.1% African American, 0.70% Native American, 2.9% Asian, 0.3% Pacific Islander, 6.3% from other races, and 4.2% from two or more races. Hispanics or Latinos of any race were 32.3% of the population.

Of the 7,575 households, 29.3% had children under the age of 18 living with them, 47% were married couples living together, 4.5% had a male householder with no wife present, 14.1% had a female householder with no husband present, and 34.3% were not families. About 27.8% of all households were made up of individuals living alone, and 7% had someone living alone who was 65 years of age or older. The average household size was 2.45 and the average family size was 3.00.

In the city, the population was distributed as 27.1% from age 0 to 19, 7.5% from 20 to 24, 26.7% from 25 to 44, 26.1% from 45 to 64, and 12.7% who were 65 years of age or older. The median age was 36.1 years. For every 100 females, there were 98 males.

The median income for a household in the city was $51,900, and for a family was $61,066. The per capita income for the city was $26,019. About 13.7% of families and 17.6% of the population were below the poverty line, including 25.3% of those under age 18 and 11.3% of those age 65 or over.

Education

Universal City is served by the Judson , Randolph Field and Schertz-Cibolo-Universal City Independent School Districts.

Universal City is also home to two private K–12 schools: First Baptist Academy of Universal City (FBA); and Calvary Chapel Christian Academy (CCCA), a tuition-free institution.

The Universal City Public Library is in the city.

Northeast Lakeview Community College, a campus of the Alamo Colleges, is located in Universal City.

References

External links

 Universal City official website

Cities in Bexar County, Texas
Cities in Texas
Greater San Antonio